Voice of Hope may refer to:

Voice of Hope, Voice of Hope Ministries, Inc., an American non-profit organization operating in Texas
Voice of Hope (album), 2014 debut album by South African opera singer Pumeza Matshikiza